Michelle Freeman (born 5 May 1969) is a former Jamaican track & field athlete who was an Olympic bronze medalist.

Freeman was born in Saint Catherine Parish, Jamaica. In 1988, she  was awarded the Austin Sealy Trophy for the most outstanding athlete of the 1988 CARIFTA Games.  She received an athletic scholarship to attend the University of Florida in Gainesville, Florida, where she was a member of the Florida Gators track and field team in National Collegiate Athletics Association (NCAA) competition from 1989 to 1992. She was seven-time Southeastern Conference (SEC) champion and a member of the Gators' NCAA championship 4x400-meter relay team.  Freeman received eight All-American honors, and still retains the Gators' team records in the 55-meter hurdles, 55-meter dash, 100-meter dash and 100-meter hurdles. She was inducted into the University of Florida Athletic Hall of Fame as a "Gator Great" in 2011.

Freeman received the gold medal for winning the 100-meter hurdles at the 1994 Commonwealth Games in Victoria, British Columbia. She competed for Jamaica at the 1996 Summer Olympics in Atlanta, Georgia, where she won the bronze medal with her teammates Juliet Cuthbert, Nikole Mitchell and Merlene Ottey in the women's 4x100-meter relay event.  She was also a member of the Jamaican Olympic team in 1992 and 2000.

See also 

 List of Olympic medalists in athletics (women)
 List of University of Florida alumni
 List of University of Florida Athletic Hall of Fame members
 List of University of Florida Olympians

References

External links 
 

1969 births
Living people
People from Saint Catherine Parish
Athletes (track and field) at the 1991 Pan American Games
Athletes (track and field) at the 1992 Summer Olympics
Athletes (track and field) at the 1994 Commonwealth Games
Athletes (track and field) at the 1996 Summer Olympics
Athletes (track and field) at the 2000 Summer Olympics
Pan American Games competitors for Jamaica
Commonwealth Games medallists in athletics
Commonwealth Games gold medallists for Jamaica
Florida Gators women's track and field athletes
Jamaican female hurdlers
Jamaican female sprinters
Olympic athletes of Jamaica
Olympic bronze medalists for Jamaica
World Athletics Championships medalists
Medalists at the 1996 Summer Olympics
Olympic bronze medalists in athletics (track and field)
Goodwill Games medalists in athletics
World Athletics Indoor Championships winners
Competitors at the 1998 Goodwill Games
Competitors at the 1990 Goodwill Games
20th-century Jamaican women
Medallists at the 1994 Commonwealth Games